The Adirondack Daily Enterprise is a daily (6 days per week) newspaper published in Saranac Lake, New York. It also covers Lake Placid, New York. The two areas also have in common the two-site Adirondack Medical Center.

History
This newspaper, along with Lake Placid News, was purchased by William M. Doolittle Jr. in 1970. Nearly fifty years later researchers uncovered that the newspaper, which "has trumpeted 'since 1894' for a generation in its masthead," originated in 1895. Moreover, it was "from the consolidation of two papers" (one named Adirondack Pioneer, the other Saranac Lake Enterprise).

The Associated Press includes reports from Adirondack Daily Enterprise. Other newspapers, including The New York Times, pick up some of their scoops and stories.

The newspaper has a history of activism in local matters. They opposed the renaming of a major regional college; their efforts "collected more than 3,200 signatures asking the college not to change its name."

Controversy
They "published a confidential salary list" including elected officials who "are also working for the Olympic committee and getting paid for it." The town clerk, with 24 years of service to his community, said that "elected officials should not 'serve two masters.'"

References

Newspapers published in New York (state)